Gábor Máthé (born July 2, 1985, in Debrecen, Hungary) is a Hungarian male tennis player, who competes in the men's single and double during his career. His team is Tatár Tennis Club in Debrecen, Hungary. He is best known for winning the men's single tennis final on August 2 at the 2013 Summer Deaflympics in Sofia, Bulgaria, with a three set victory over Mikaël Laurent from France.

Results
 2017. Deaflympics,5th (Men's Singles)
 2013. Deaflympics, Sofia. Gold(Men's Singles)
 2012. Hungarian Champion in double 
 2010. Tennis Deaf World Cup, Las Vegas. Silver: single, Gold: double.
 2009. Deaflympics, Taipei. Bronze(Men's Singles)
 2008. European Deaf Tennis Championship, Bucharest. Gold
 2006. British  Deaf Open Championships, Nottingham. Gold: single, Gold: double 
 2005. Tennis Deaf World Cup, Austria. Silver 
 2004. European Deaf Tennis Championship. 5-8th place
 2001. Deaflympics, Rome.(Men's Singles) 
 2000. European Deaf Tennis Championship. In the 16.
Máthé started the 2013 Sofia Summer Deaflympics with wins over an Indian, an American and a German opponent.  In the semifinal he met the Austrian Mario Kargl and won in straight sets. He culminated his run with a three set, three-hour-long win over Frenchman Mikaël Laurent to become Deaflympic Champion in tennis singles. He became champion without losing a set throughout the whole competition.

Others

 2009. Fair Play Award winner Summer Deaflympics in Taipei
 2008. Sportsman of the Year Finalist

References

External links
 Tatár TC - Tennis Club 
 Paramhans Swami Maheshwarananda - Yoga in Daily Life  
 Máthé's coach Tibor Kökény 
 Hungarian Olympic Association on support of yoga 
 2013. 

1985 births
Living people
Deaf tennis players
Hungarian male tennis players
Sportspeople from Debrecen
People from Hajdú-Bihar County
Hungarian deaf people